Glenns is an unincorporated community in Gloucester County, Virginia, United States. It is home to one of the campuses of Rappahannock Community College.

References

Unincorporated communities in Gloucester County, Virginia
Unincorporated communities in Virginia